Phelungre is a village in Kiphire district of Nagaland state of India.

References

Villages in Kiphire district